Simpang-kiri River (means: Left Junction River) is a river in Riau province, central-eastern Sumatra, Indonesia, about 800 km northwest of the capital Jakarta.

Geography
The river flows in the central area of Sumatra with predominantly tropical rainforest climate (designated as Af in the Köppen-Geiger climate classification). The annual average temperature in the area is 24 °C. The warmest month is March, when the average temperature is around 26 °C, and the coldest is January, at 23 °C. The average annual rainfall is 2667 mm. The wettest month is November, with an average of 402 mm rainfall, and the driest is June, with 104 mm rainfall.

See also
List of rivers of Indonesia
List of rivers of Sumatra

References

Rivers of Riau
Rivers of Indonesia